Bigler is a census-designated place located in Bradford Township, Clearfield County in the state of Pennsylvania. As of the 2020 census, the population was 356.

Bigler was originally known as Williams Grove, but was renamed because the mail was being confused with another Williams Grove, in Cumberland County. As Governor William Bigler was from Clearfield, Pennsylvania, the county seat of Clearfield County, Bigler was named after him.

Demographics

References

Census-designated places in Clearfield County, Pennsylvania
Census-designated places in Pennsylvania